Robert Strawbridge Grosvenor (born 1937) is an American contemporary sculptor, installation artist, and draftsman. He is known for his monumental room installations, which border between sculpture and architecture. Grosvenor is associated with minimalism.

Early life and education
Robert Strawbridge Grosvenor was born March 31, 1937 in New York City, New York. In 1960, Grosvenor moved to Philadelphia.

Work
Grosvenor was one of the 10 artists that founded the cooperative Park Place Gallery in New York City, open from 1963 to 1967. The other founders of the gallery included Mark di Suvero, Dean Fleming, Forrest Myers, Peter Forakis, Leo Valledor, Tamara Melcher, Tony Magar, and Edwin Ruda.

In Grosvenor's work, he uses a mixture of industrial materials such as car body parts, plexiglass, stone, brick, concrete, and plastic. One of his best known sculptures is Tapanga (1965), originally exhibited in the mid-1960's and later realized in a monumental version at the Storm King Art Center. His work has helped define minimalism and was included in the seminal group exhibitions, Primary Structures (Jewish Museum, 1966), and Minimal Art (Gemeentemuseum Den Haag, 1968).

Art market
Grosvenor is represented by Karma Gallery and Galerie Max Hetzler. Until 2023, he also worked with Paula Cooper Gallery.

Recognition
 2020 – Ezratti Family Prize for Sculpture award, ICA Miami, Miami, Florida
1972 – American Academy of Arts and Letters grant.
1970, 1983 – Guggenheim Fellowship;
 1970 – National Endowment for the Arts grant;

Exhibitions 
List of select exhibits by Grosvenor:

Solo exhibitions 
 2019–2021, Robert Grosvenor, ICA Miami, Miami, Florida
 1992, Kunsthalle Bern, Bern, Switzerland

Group exhibitions

References

External links 
 Oral history interview with Robert Grosvenor, 1972 Aug. 9, from the Archives of American Art, Smithsonian Institution

1937 births
Living people
Artists from New York City
École nationale supérieure des arts décoratifs alumni
Minimalist artists
20th-century American sculptors
American male sculptors
Sculptors from New York (state)
21st-century American sculptors
20th-century American male artists